Stuart Jeffrey Randall, Baron Randall of St Budeaux (22 June 1938 – 11 August 2012) was a British Labour politician who was Member of Parliament (MP) for Kingston upon Hull West from 1983 until he stood down in 1997.

Born in Plymouth, Randall was educated locally and worked as a fitter in the city's dockyards. He gained a BSc degree in Electrical Engineering from University College, Cardiff and worked in the electronics industry for twenty years.
He joined the Labour Party in 1966 and contested South Worcestershire at the October 1974 election and Midlands West at the 1979 European election before entering Parliament. He served as parliamentary private secretary to Deputy Leader of the Labour Party Roy Hattersley and as opposition spokesman on Agriculture and Fisheries and Home Affairs.

After his retirement from the House of Commons, he was made a life peer as Baron Randall of St Budeaux, of St Budeaux in the County of Devon.

References

 Times Guide to the House of Commons, Times Newspapers Limited, 1992 and 1997 editions.

External links 
 

1938 births
2012 deaths
Alumni of Cardiff University
Electrical, Electronic, Telecommunications and Plumbing Union-sponsored MPs
Labour Party (UK) MPs for English constituencies
Randall of St Budeaux
Life peers created by Elizabeth II
UK MPs 1983–1987
UK MPs 1987–1992
UK MPs 1992–1997